Newar art is the art form practiced over centuries by Newar people. The pictorial art consists of:
 Paubha
 Wall paintings (murals)
 Paintings on the walls of temples
 Paintings in manuscripts (books)
 Copper and brass sculptures
 Stone sculptures
 Wooden sculptures

The Newars are the creators of most examples of art and architecture in Nepal. Traditional Newar art is basically religious art. Newar devotional paubha painting, sculpture and metal craftsmanship are world-renowned for their exquisite beauty. The earliest dated paubha discovered so far is Vasudhara Mandala which was painted in 1365 AD (Nepal Sambat 485). The murals on the walls of two 15th-century monasteries in the former kingdom of Mustang in the Nepal Himalaya provide illustrations of Newar works outside the Kathmandu Valley. Stone sculpture, wood carving, repoussé art and metal statues of Buddhist and Hindu deities made by the lost-wax casting process are specimens of Newar artistry. The Peacock Window of Bhaktapur and Desay Madu Jhya of Kathmandu are known for their wood carving.

Building elements like the carved Newar window, roof struts on temples and the tympanum of temples and shrine houses exhibit traditional creativity. From as early as the seventh century, visitors have noted the skill of Newar artists and craftsmen who left their influence on the art of Tibet and China. Newars introduced the lost-wax technique into Bhutan and they were commissioned to paint murals on the walls of monasteries there. Sandpainting of mandala made during festivals and death rituals is another specialty of Newar art.

Besides exhibiting a high level of skill in traditional religious art, Newar artists have been at the forefront in introducing Western art styles in Nepal. Raj Man Singh Chitrakar (1797-1865) is credited with starting watercolor painting in the country. Bhaju Man Chitrakar (1817–1874), Tej Bahadur Chitrakar (1898-1971) and Chandra Man Singh Maskey were other pioneer artists who introduced modern style paintings incorporating concepts of lighting and perspective.

Paubhas or thangkas were traditionally painted by Chitrakars.

See also
Newar people
Nepal Bhasa
Thangka
Newar architecture
Chitrakar
Newar dance
Newar music

References

Further reading
Pal, Pratapaditya. 1970. Vaisnava Iconology in Nepal: A Study in Art and Religion. (Calcutta: The Asia Society).
Pal, Pratapaditya. 1974a. Buddhist Art in Licchavi Nepal. Marg Publications. Vol. 27. No. 3 (June 1974).
Pal, Pratapaditya. 1974b. The Arts of Nepal, Part I: Sculpture. (Leiden: E. J. Brill).
Pal, Pratapaditya. 1978. The Arts of Nepal, Part II: Painting. (Leiden: E. J. Brill).
Slusser, Mary Shepherd. 1982. Nepal Mandala. Two Vols. (Princeton, New Jersey: Princeton University Press).
Bangdel, Lain S. 1982. The Early Sculptures of Nepal. (New Delhi: Vikas Publication).
Bangdel, Lain S. 1987. 2500 Years of Nepalese Art. (Leipzig: VEB A. Seemann Verlag).
Bangdel, Lain S. 1987. Zweitausendfünfhundert Jahre nepalesische Kunst. (München: List Verlag).
Schick, Jürgen. 1989. Die Götter verlassen das Land: Kunstraub in Nepal. (Graz: Akademische Druck- u. Verlagsanstalt).
Bangdel, Lain S. 1989. Stolen Images of Nepal. (Kathmandu: Royal Nepal Academy).
Bangdel, Lain S. 1995. Inventory of Stone Sculptures of the Kathmandu Valley. (Kathmandu: Royal Nepal Academy).
Bangdel, Lain S. and Aryal, Mukunda Raj. 1996. A Report on the Study of Iconography of Kathmandu Valley and their Preservation and Protection. (Kathmandu: Department of Archaeology, Nepal, 2053 [1996]).
Schick, Jürgen. 1998. The Gods are Leaving the Country: Art Theft From Nepal. [Revised English Edition]. (Bangkok: Orchid Press, 1998).
von Schroeder, Ulrich. 2019. Nepalese Stone Sculptures. Volume One: Hindu; Volume Two: Buddhist. 1556 pages, 2898 illustrations(Visual Dharma Publications, 2019). . SD card with 15,000 digital photographs of Nepalese sculptures and other subjects as public domain.

External links
 

Newar
Nepalese art